Kolonić may refer to

Kolunić, a village in Bosnia and Herzegovina
Leopold Karl von Kollonitsch, otherwise Kolonić, (1631–1707), a Cardinal Archbishop of the Austrian Empire